Timurbugha (died 1475) was the seventeenth Burji Sultan of Mamluk Egypt, briefly ruling from late 1467 to early 1468 when he was deposed. He used the title of al-Malik al-Zāhir.

Biography
Timurbugha was of Greek or Albanian descent. He later led the defence against the Mamluks of Sayf ad-Din Inal who managed eventually to depose Al-Mansur Fakhr-ad-Din Uthman. Later on, he was imprisoned in Alexandria for five years, then in Nimrod Castle for six years. In , he was released by Inal to accompany the pilgrims to Mecca.

In , he returned to Cairo during the reign of Khushqadam, in which he held several positions until the sultan's death. Sayf ad-Din Bilbay had ruled briefly in late 1467, before Timurbugha became the new sultan on 5 December 1467. Timurbugha was well educated and excelled in law, history, literature and poetry. During his reign, political prisoners were released from Alexandria, including Al-Mu'ayyad Shihab al-Din Ahmad.

However, his reign lasted less than two months, as he was dethroned in a palace coup on 30 January 1468. Qaitbay, atabak appointed by Timurbugha, managed to defeat the rebels led by Khairbek and free Timurbugha who later retired in Damietta until his death in 1475.

References

Sources
 
 
 

1475 deaths
15th-century Mamluk sultans
Burji sultans